†Pupilla obliquicosta  is an extinct species  of minute, air-breathing land snail, a terrestrial pulmonate gastropod mollusk or micromollusk in the family Pupillidae. This species was endemic to Saint Helena but is now extinct due to human activities.

References

Pupillidae
Extinct gastropods
Gastropods described in 1892
Taxonomy articles created by Polbot